The National Institute of Civil Aviation (Spanish: Instituto Nacional de Aeronáutica Civil, INAC) is a Venezuelan civil aviation agency. Its headquarters were in the Torre Británica in Caracas, Miranda, and it had offices in the Edificio Sede IAIM on the property of Simón Bolívar International Airport in Maiquetía, Vargas.

The Decreto con fuerza de Ley de Aviación Civil (Decree-Civil Aviation Act) established INAC. The decree, of the date September 28, 2001, was published in the Gaceta Oficial No. 37.293. The investigation of serious aviation accidents and incidents was instead the responsibility of the Junta Investigadora de Accidentes de Aviación Civil (JIAAC), a separate agency. As of 2012 the departments of the Ministry of Aquatic and Air Transport serve as the civil aviation authority and as the accident investigation authority.

References

External links

 Instituto Nacional de Aeronáutica Civil 
 Instituto Nacional de Aeronáutica Civil  (Archive)
 INAC Venezuela - Twitter 
 INAC Movil -  (Archive)
 Executive Summary Venezuela - International Civil Aviation Organization (Archive)

Government of Venezuela
Venezuela
Aviation organizations based in Venezuela